Euparkerella, sometimes known as Guanabara frogs, is a genus of frogs in the family Strabomantidae. They are endemic to the Atlantic coastal forests in the south-eastern Brazilian states of Espírito Santo and Rio de Janeiro. The name Euparkerella honours H. W. Parker, a herpetologist who named the type species, with the Greek prefix eu meaning true and suffix ella, a diminutive form.

Taxonomy
Species of Euparkerella are traditionally distinguished using morphological traits. However, these species do not align well with genetically distinct units, with the latter suggesting higher diversity than the former, especially within Euparkerella brasiliensis and Euparkerella cochranae. It remains unresolved whether the genetically distinct units qualify as different species.

Description
Species of Euparkerella are small frogs, growing to  snout–vent length at most. The digits are extremely reduced, compared to those of their larger relatives. Head is narrower than the body. Differentiated tympanic membrane and tympanic annulus are absent. Dorsum is finely granular. Venter is areolate.

Species
The following species are recognized in the genus Euparkerella:
 Euparkerella brasiliensis (Parker, 1926)
 Euparkerella cochranae Izecksohn, 1988
 Euparkerella cryptica Hepp, Carvalho-e-Silva, Carvalho-e-Silva, and Folly, 2015
 Euparkerella robusta Izecksohn, 1988
 Euparkerella tridactyla Izecksohn, 1988

References

Strabomantidae
 
Amphibian genera
Amphibians of South America
endemic fauna of Brazil